Irie Time (pronounced 'eye-ree') is a Reggae band that formed in the early 1990s in Houston, Texas. Irie Time initially performed Reggae music exclusively.  Their Island Romance album tracks were recorded in Kingston, Jamaica and were produced by Wailers guitarist Earl 'Chinna' Smith.  
 
By the mid-1990s, they had also begun incorporating Soca music in their repertoire.  The title track from their Island Romance album featured a Soca version, as well as a Reggae version, and a companion dub album called Irie Time in Dub was also released.

The band toured in Europe during the summer of 2001 and subsequently released the live album Live Up.  Irie Time's most recent album, entitled It's About Time, incorporates jazz influences, creating a Reggae jazz/ pop hybrid, and the band continues to perform regionally.

Discography
 Irie Time
 Reggae Hits Vol. 1
 Island Romance
 Irie Time in Dub
 Live Up
 It's About Time

External links
Irie Time website
[ Allmusic biography]

American reggae musical groups
Musical groups from Houston